Hello Caesar! is a 1927 German silent comedy film directed by Reinhold Schünzel and starring Schünzel, Mary Nolan, and Wilhelm Diegelmann.  It is partly set in the spa town of Karlsbad in Czechoslovakia.

Cast

References

Bibliography

External links 
 

1927 films
Films of the Weimar Republic
German comedy films
German silent feature films
1927 comedy films
Films directed by Reinhold Schünzel
German black-and-white films
UFA GmbH films
Silent comedy films
1920s German films